P19 may refer to:

Aircraft 
 Aviamilano P.19 Scricciolo, an Italian trainer
 Curtiss P-19, a cancelled American fighter design
 P.Z.L. P.19, a Polish sports plane

Other uses 
 P19 cell, an embryonic carcinoma cell line
 P-19 radar, a Soviet radar system
 Papyrus 19, a biblical manuscript
 RNA silencing suppressor p19
 Stellar Airpark, in Maricopa County, Arizona, United States
 P19, a Latvian state regional road